Roger Wayne Taylor (born January 5, 1958) is a former American football offensive tackle in the National Football League. Taylor was selected by the Kansas City Chiefs in the third round (75th overall) out of Oklahoma State University in the 1981 NFL Draft.

Professional career

Kansas City Chiefs
The Kansas City Chiefs obtained Taylor in the third round of the 1981 NFL Draft as the result of a draft-day trade that sent running back Tony Reed to the Denver Broncos in exchange for the 75th pick of the 1981 NFL Draft (Roger Taylor) and a 4th round pick in the 1982 NFL Draft (Stuart Anderson). Taylor would go on to play in 13 regular season games for the Chiefs during their 1981 season.

In 1982 Taylor attended the Chiefs' training camp, but was released as part of the final cuts on September 6, 1982. As fate would have it, the other players connected to the 1981 draft-day trade were released that day as well, Stuart Anderson by the Kansas City Chiefs and Tony Reed by the Denver Broncos.

Winnipeg Blue Bombers
After being released by the Kansas City Chiefs, Taylor played for the Winnipeg Blue Bombers during the 1982 season. During his time with the Blue Bombers Taylor would wear jersey number 51.

Buffalo Bills
As a free agent, he was signed by the Buffalo Bills in 1983 and on the second day of training camp he injured his knee. He spent the entire year on the injured reserve list and did not play in any pre-season or regular season games for the Bills during their 1983 season.

New Orleans Saints
The New Orleans Saints released him on July 31, 1985.

Professional Career Statistics

References

1958 births
Living people
Sportspeople from Shawnee, Oklahoma
Players of American football from Oklahoma
American football offensive tackles
Oklahoma State Cowboys football players
Kansas City Chiefs players
Winnipeg Blue Bombers players